The women's race of the 2010 Sparkassen Giro Bochum took place on 8 August 2010. It was the 10th women's edition of the Sparkassen Giro Bochum. The race started and ended in Bochum, Germany and spanned . 57 of the 97 participants finished. The race is a UCI 1.1 category race.

Race
The 2010 Sparkassen Giro Bochum was won by the Dutch rider Ellen van Dijk, who won the sprint from a breakaway group of nine riders in wet and miserable conditions. Tiffany Cromwell and Maaike Polspoel finished second and third with over three times the length of a bicycle behind Van Dijk.

Results

References

2010 in German sport
Sparkassen Giro
2010 in women's road cycling